St. Joseph's Model Higher Secondary School is a private (unaided) Christian mixed-sex English-medium boarding school run by the Syro-Malabar Catholic Archdiocese of Thrissur, located in Kuriachira, Thrissur. It is situated at Kuriachira near Canal Stop, about half a kilometer south of Kuriachira centre.

St. Joseph's follows the Kerala State Syllabus. It has 1,526 students from kindergarten to higher secondary school and a Teacher Training Institute.

The school was founded in 1961 by Acharya J.C. Chiramal (Chakkoru Master), as per Kerala G.O. (MS) No.422/Edn dated Trivandrum 24.7.1961. Sri.V.V. Giri, former President of India, inaugurated the institution. It was originally established to serve the Catholic minority community, as per the provision of the Article 30(1) of the Indian constitution. It was later directed by Chiramal's son Fr. Antony Jees. After the demise of Jees, the school was entrusted to the Archdiocese of Thrissur. 

Kindergarten and Lower Primary sections were added in 1993 and 1995 respectively. The high school was upgraded to Higher Secondary School in 2002. The Teacher Training Institute was inaugurated in 2005, and in 2010, the school established an ICSE wing.

Notable alumni
 Rajan Pallan, Ex Mayor Corporation of Thrissur City

References

Christian schools in Kerala
Primary schools in Kerala
High schools and secondary schools in Kerala
Schools in Thrissur
Educational institutions established in 1961
1961 establishments in Kerala